On 10 February 1970, a bus carrying passengers to an El Al airplane at the Munich-Riem Airport, West Germany was attacked by terrorists. One person was killed and 23 were wounded in the attack.

Attack
An El Al Boeing 707 jet was preparing to take off for London when three terrorists opened fire with submachine guns and hand grenades on a bus carrying passengers to the plane. The attack killed one person and wounded 23 others. The pilot of the plane was slightly wounded when he wrestled one grenade-wielding terrorist to the ground while the other terrorists were shooting. After a brief gunfight with police the terrorists were arrested. As the actor Assi Dayan, a son of the Israeli Defence Minister was among the passengers some suggested him to have been the target of the attack, while others disregarded this by noting that the attack was indiscriminate and random as Dayan himself was unhurt. Another passenger was actress Hanna Maron who was critically wounded and had to have her leg amputated.

Aftermath
The Popular Democratic Front for the Liberation of Palestine (PDFLP), as well as the "Action Organization for the Liberation of Palestine" in Jordan claimed responsibility for the attack. The three terrorists arrested for the attack were identified as Mohammed Hadidi and Mohammed Hanasi from Jordan, and Abdul Rachman from Egypt. The terrorists were released and deported later the same year in response to the Dawson's Field hijackings.

See also
 Munich massacre

References

1970 murders in Germany
1970 bus attack
1970 mass shootings in Europe
Attacks on buses by Palestinian militant groups 
Democratic Front for the Liberation of Palestine attacks
El Al accidents and incidents
February 1970 crimes
February 1970 events in Europe
Mass shootings in Germany
1970 bus attack
Palestinian terrorist incidents in Germany
Terrorist incidents in Bavaria
Terrorist incidents in Germany in 1970
Terrorist incidents on buses in Europe